Lanište may refer to several places:

 Lanište (Bela Palanka), a village in the municipality of Bela Palanka, Serbia
 Lanište, Croatia, a suburb of Zagreb
 Lanište, Ključ, a village near Ključ, Una-Sana Canton, Bosnia
 Novo Lanište, a village near Jagodina, Serbia
 Staro Lanište, a village near Jagodina, Serbia

See also
 Lanišće
 Lanišče